The 2016 season was the Seattle Seahawks' 41st in the National Football League (NFL) and their seventh under head coach Pete Carroll. On October 23, the team played the Arizona Cardinals in a game that ended in a 6–6 tie, the Seahawks' first tie in franchise history. With their win against the Los Angeles Rams in Week 15, the Seahawks claimed their third NFC West title in the last four years. The Seahawks defeated the Detroit Lions in the Wild Card Round, but lost to the eventual NFC champion Atlanta Falcons in the Divisional Round.

For the first time since trading for him in 2010, Marshawn Lynch did not play for the Seahawks as he retired in the offseason. Lynch would later come out of retirement to play for his hometown team Oakland Raiders before their relocation to Las Vegas before rejoining the Seahawks in December 2019.

Roster changes

Free agents

Signings

Departures

Trades
 September 3: The Seahawks acquired strong safety Dewey McDonald in a trade that sent a conditional 7th-round draft pick to the Oakland Raiders.

Draft

Draft trades

Undrafted free agents
All undrafted free agents were signed after the 2016 NFL draft concluded on April 30, unless noted otherwise.

Staff

Final roster
{{NFL final roster
|Year=2016
|TeamName=Seattle Seahawks
|Active=53
|Inactive=16
|PS=13

|Quarterbacks=

|Running Backs=

|Wide Receivers=

|Tight Ends=
 *

|Offensive Linemen=

|Defensive Linemen=
 *
 *

|Linebackers=

 *
 *

|Defensive Backs=

 *

|Special Teams=

|Reserve Lists=

|Practice Squad=

}}
 Starters in bold.
 (*) denotes players that were selected to the 2017 Pro Bowl.

Preseason
The Seahawks' preliminary preseason schedule was announced on April 7. Exact dates and times were finalized on April 14, when the regular season schedule was announced.

Regular season
ScheduleNote: Intra-division opponents are in bold''' text.

Game summaries

Week 1: vs. Miami Dolphins

Week 2: at Los Angeles Rams

Week 3: vs. San Francisco 49ers

Week 4: at New York Jets

Week 6: vs. Atlanta Falcons

Week 7: at Arizona Cardinals

Chandler Catanzaro and Steven Hauschka both missed chip-shot field goals in overtime as the Seahawks and Cardinals played to a 6–6 draw, the first tie in Seattle Seahawks history.

Week 8: at New Orleans Saints

Week 9: vs. Buffalo Bills

With the win, the Seahawks have now recorded at least one victory at CenturyLink Field against each of the 31 other franchises.

Week 10: at New England Patriots

Over one and half year after Super Bowl XLIX, the Seahawks were trying to get their revenge against the Patriots after the heartbreaking interception. They successfully got their revenge by stopping the Patriots from getting into the end zone, and won the game 31-24. The Seahawks were the only team to defeat the Patriots under Tom Brady during this season (their one other loss, against the Buffalo Bills in Week 4, happened during Brady's suspension for the Deflategate scandal). This also marked Pete Carroll's first game in New England in 17 years after he got fired from the Patriots organization.

Week 11: vs. Philadelphia Eagles

Week 12: at Tampa Bay Buccaneers

Week 13: vs. Carolina Panthers

Sunday Night Football featured a Divisional Playoff rematch from 2015 as the Seattle Seahawks faced the Carolina Panthers in CenturyLink field. Russell Wilson threw for 277 yards with one touchdown and one interception while Cam Newton was held to 182 yards and one touchdown. This was the first time that Seattle had scored 40 points in a regular season game since the 2013 season. Seattle improved their record to 8-3-1 of season. The win was not without cost, however, as star safety Earl Thomas broke his leg early in the second quarter, knocking him out for the rest of the season.

Week 14: at Green Bay Packers

Russell Wilson had his worst game of his career, throwing only one touchdown and a career-high five picks against a red-hot Packers team, causing the Seahawks to fall to their worst loss in the last six years. Seattle's defense was without safety Earl Thomas, who was out for the year with a broken leg. They only managed one sack on the final play in the third quarter, ending a streak of 10 consecutive quarters without a sack. Aaron Rodgers, with a 3:0 TD-INT ratio, posted a 150.8 passer rating in this game, the highest allowed by the Seattle defense since Pete Carroll became head coach in 2010.

Week 15: vs. Los Angeles Rams

With their 24–3 victory over the Rams, the Seahawks moved to 9–4–1 and clinched the NFC West title.

Week 16: vs. Arizona Cardinals

Week 17: at San Francisco 49ers

Postseason

Schedule

Game summaries

NFC Wild Card Playoffs: vs. (6) Detroit Lions

NFC Divisional Playoffs: at (2) Atlanta Falcons

This was the final game in Seattle for longtime Seahawks Jermaine Kearse and Steven Hauschka.

Standings

Division

Conference

References

External links
 

Seattle
Seattle Seahawks seasons
Seattle Seahawks
Seahawks
NFC West championship seasons